Galińskie  is a settlement in the administrative district of Gmina Przystajń, within Kłobuck County, Silesian Voivodeship, in southern Poland.

References

Villages in Kłobuck County